Puddin' Head is a 1941 American comedy film directed by Joseph Santley and written by Jack Townley and Milt Gross. The film stars Judy Canova, Francis Lederer, Raymond Walburn, Slim Summerville, Astrid Allwyn, Eddie Foy Jr., Alma Kruger, Hugh O'Connell and Chick Chandler. The film was released on June 25, 1941, by Republic Pictures.

Plot
Harold l. Montgomery, the scatterbrain vice-president of the United Broadcasting System, is dismayed when he learns that one-foot of the ground on which the station's imposing new structure has been built is part of the adjoining lot belonging to Judy Goober, a hillbilly girl, who could sue them for millions. Mortally afraid of his domineering, ill-tempered sister, Matilda. who is the president of the company, Montgomery decides to say nothing to her regarding the problem and, instead, takes his equally-scatterbrained son, Junior, with him to the Ozarks to talk Judy into selling the property before she learns the truth. But Judy turns out to be a hard-sell and Montgomery enlists the services of handsome Prince Karl, a frayed-at-the-cuffs but glib-of-tongue Russian who faces jail for back-alimony payments, and needs any job he can get.

Cast 
Judy Canova as Judy Goober
Francis Lederer as Prince Karl
Raymond Walburn as Harold Montgomery Sr.
Slim Summerville as Uncle Lem
Astrid Allwyn as Yvonne Jones
Eddie Foy Jr. as Harold L. Montgomery Jr.
Alma Kruger as Matilda Montgomery
Hugh O'Connell as Kincaid
Chick Chandler as Herman
Paul Harvey as Mr. Harvey
Nora Lane as Miss Jenkins
Gerald Oliver Smith as Hudson 
Wendell Niles as Randall
Vince Barnett as Otis Tarbell
Betty Blythe as Mrs. Bowser
M. J. Frankovich as Broadcaster 
Bill Days as Member of The Sportsmen Quartet 
John Rarig as Member of The Sportsmen Quartet 
Thurl Ravenscroft as Member of The Sportsmen Quartet
Max Smith as Member of The Sportsmen Quartet
Jack George as Tough 
Victor Potel as Hillbilly

References

External links
 

1941 films
1940s English-language films
American comedy films
1941 comedy films
Republic Pictures films
Films directed by Joseph Santley
American black-and-white films
1940s American films
Films set in the Ozarks
Films about hillbillies